Robert Frazen, A.C.E., is an American film and television editor.  He was nominated for the 1995 ACE Eddie Award for Best Edited One-Hour Series for Television for My So-Called Life and won a 2000 ACE Eddie Award for Best Edited Episode from a Television Mini-Series for The '60s.  In addition to this, Frazen won the Satellite Award for Best Editing for his work on Nicole Holofcener's Please Give.  Frazen is represented by ICM.

Filmography

Film

Editorial department

Thanks

Television

References

External links

interview about "I'm Thinking of Ending Things"

American film editors
Living people
Year of birth missing (living people)
American television editors